"Runaway" is a song written by English singer-songwriter Ed Sheeran and American rapper and singer Pharrell Williams then it was recorded by the former for his second studio album, x (2014) which appeared as the ninth track. The song was produced solely by Pharrell Williams.

Background
"Runaway" is the ninth track as well as the second and final track from the album that is produced by Pharrell Williams (the other being "Sing"). Described as "finger-clicking", it draws from the same influence, the sound of Justin Timberlake's debut album, that "Sing" does. Sheeran intended for the song to feature on a future project with Pharrell, but it was put on the album when he was persuaded to include "Sing".

Lyrics
The lyrics of the song describes Sheeran who no longer is able to put up with the problems of his father and decides to run away with the girl to escape the toxic environment he once called home.

Planning to leave in the early hours of the morning with his packed necessities, he intended to flee to London to pursue his music career - an act he has followed through with at the age of 16.

"Runaway wasn't even going to go on the record, it was just a cool jam I was going to use for a project down the line. I played it to Elton John and he said 'That's on your record right?' and I said 'No' and he told me I was an idiot, so it's on the record"

Critical Reception
In a Billboard track-by-track review, writer Jason Lipshutz stated: "The sassy soul of "Runaway" sounds like the perfection of the idea John Newman hatched on "Cheating," but the looped vocal snippet is Sheeran's specialty. This one is going to pop when presented live."

Composition
"Runaway" is written in the key of G-sharp minor with the tempo of 95 BPM .

Credits and personnel
Credits adapted from x album liner notes:
 Ed Sheeran – lead vocals, acoustic guitar, electric guitar, instrumentation, songwriting
 Pharrell Williams – production and songwriting
 Johnny McDaid – guitars, bass, backing vocals, percussion, piano
 Jeff Bhasker – production, piano and keys
 Geoff Swan – engineering
 Mark "Spike" Stent – mixing
 Ruadhri Cushnan – mixing
 Stuart Hawkes – mastering
 Coco Arquette – additional vocals
 Andrew Coleman – recording, digital editing and arrangement
 Courteney Cox – additional vocals
 Eamon Harkin – additional vocals
 Emile Haynie – additional production
 Ramon Rivas – recording assistant
 Rob Sucheki – recording assistant

Charts

Certifications

References

2014 songs
Songs written by Ed Sheeran
Ed Sheeran songs
Songs written by Pharrell Williams